Eitel Danilo Cantoni (listed in some sources as Heitel Cantoni, born in Montevideo, 4 October 1906 – died in Montevideo, 6 June 1997) was a racing driver from Uruguay. He participated in three World Championship Grands Prix, debuting on 19 July 1952. He was the patron of the Escuderia Bandeirantes outfit, which entered Maserati A6GCM cars for Cantoni and other drivers. He scored no championship points, but also competed in four other Grands Prix during that year, his best finish being seventh at the Modena Grand Prix. Cantoni later competed in South American endurance races.

Complete World Championship results
(key)

Non-championship Grand Prix results
(key) (Races in bold indicate pole position, races in italics indicate fastest lap)

References 

1906 births
1997 deaths
Sportspeople from Montevideo
Uruguayan people of Italian descent
Uruguayan racing drivers
Uruguayan Formula One drivers